Utah State Route 100 (SR-100) is a state highway in the U.S. state of Utah.

Route description
The route begins as 400 North at SR-99 (Main Street) in Fillmore. From here, it travels west out of town, crosses over I-15. After , the route turns north and continues through rural Millard County for about  until it ends at US-50.

The course of this route trends generally from southeast to northwest. Although there is not an abundance of directional banner signage on the route, what few banners that exist indicate that SR-100 is an east-west route. Despite this, the route description and mileposts begin in Fillmore as they would if this were a north-south route.

Photo Gallery

History
SR-100 was originally established in 1935 as connecting Fillmore at SR-1 (Main Street) and Flowell. The construction of I-15 through the area resulted in the old alignment of the route along 100 North to be severed in two by the interstate, so in 1965, the route was moved north three blocks to its current alignment along 400 North because of the proposed underpass on that street.

Major intersections

References

100
 100